Jeffrey Lionell Cumberland (born May 2, 1987) is a former American football tight end. He was signed as an undrafted free agent by the New York Jets in 2010. He played college football at Illinois.

Early years
Cumberland was selected to the Ohio News Network/Ohio High Magazine All-Ohio team. He was an PrepStar All-American in high school. He was ranked as the 11th-best prospect from the state of Ohio.

College career
In 2006, Cumberland was selected as an honorable mention freshman All-America by The Sporting News. He played for the University of Illinois.

Professional career

New York Jets

Cumberland went undrafted and would later sign with the New York Jets. He only appeared in one game during his rookie season in 2010 and caught one pass for three yards.

Cumberland made his NFL debut against the Buffalo Bills on January 2, 2011. Cumberland suffered a torn achilles tendon on September 25, 2011 against the Oakland Raiders. He was placed on the injured reserve list the following day. In the 2011 season, he appeared in three games and had two receptions for 35 yards on the season.

In the 2012 season, Cumberland appeared in 15 games and recorded 29 receptions for 359 yards and three touchdowns.

In the 2013 season, Cumberland appeared in 15 games and recorded 26 receptions for 398 yards and a career-high four touchdowns.

Cumberland and the Jets agreed on a new three-year contract on March 7, 2014. In the 2014 season, he appeared in all 16 regular season games and recorded 23 receptions for 247 yards and three touchdowns.

In the 2015 season, Cumberland appeared in 15 games but only had five receptions for 77 yards.

On March 9, 2016, Cumberland was released by the Jets.

San Diego / Los Angeles Chargers
On April 4, 2016, Cumberland signed a one-year contract with the San Diego Chargers. He suffered a torn Achilles in the Chargers' second preseason game, ending his season.

On April 12, 2017, Cumberland re-signed with the Chargers on a one-year contract. He was released on September 2, 2017. He was re-signed on November 7, 2017.

NFL career statistics

References

External links
Fighting Illini bio
New York Jets bio

Living people
1987 births
Sportspeople from Columbus, Ohio
Players of American football from Ohio
Illinois Fighting Illini football players
American football tight ends
New York Jets players
San Diego Chargers players
Los Angeles Chargers players
Ed Block Courage Award recipients